Frans Ceusters is a Flemish television writer.

Mainly a writer for Belgian television, Ceusters is probably best known for his writing of De Kotmadam since 1991 working co-writer Jaak Boon. and with director Ronnie Commissaris. Since 1998, Ceusters has written the script for Alle maten.

External links
 

Flemish television writers
Male television writers
Year of birth missing (living people)
Living people
Belgian male writers
Place of birth missing (living people)